The Honda NSX, marketed in North America as the Acura NSX, is a two-seat, mid-engined coupe sports car manufactured by Honda.

The origins of the NSX trace back to 1984, with the HP-X (Honda Pininfarina eXperimental) concept, which was a mid-engine 3.0 L V6 engine rear wheel drive sports car. Honda committed to the project, with the intention of meeting or exceeding the performance of the then V8 engine Ferrari range, while offering reliability and a lower price point. The concept thus evolved and had its name changed to NS-X, which stood for "New", "Sportscar" "eXperimental", although the production model was launched as the NSX.

Gordon Murray, the designer of the McLaren F1 supercar, stated that he used the NSX as the inspiration for the F1 after test driving many high performance cars and finding the NSX chassis performed the best. Murray stated that the design was "monumental" to sportscar design. He found that the car could easily have handled more power and attempted to convince Honda to develop a more powerful engine, but they declined. This resulted in Murray developing the F1 with a BMW engine, but he was so fond of the NSX that he bought one for personal use and drove it for 75,000 km. Murray stated that the NSX was "dear to his heart".



First generation (NA1/NA2; 1990) 

The NSX was designed by a team led by Chief Designer Masahito Nakano and Executive Chief Engineer Shigeru Uehara. It benefited from advanced aerodynamics and styling inspired by an F-16 fighter jet cockpit and input from the late Formula One World Champion Ayrton Senna during the final development stages.

This NSX became the world's first mass-produced car to feature an all-aluminium body. It was powered by an all-aluminium 3.0 L V6 engine, which featured Honda's VTEC (Variable Valve Timing and Lift Electronic Control) system developed in the 1980s, a 5-speed manual transmission, or starting in 1994 the SportShift 4-speed automatic transmission, also known as F-Matic, which allows the option of conventional automatic shifting or manually shifting with a fingertip shift lever on the steering column.

It was presented at the 1989 Chicago Auto Show and was built in a purpose-made factory in Japan, for sale from 1990. It was originally available as a coupé and, from 1995, a targa top. It underwent a performance upgrade in 1997, which saw the arrival of a larger 3.2 L V6 engine, and a facelift in 2002 where the pop-up headlights were removed. The first generation NSX was discontinued in 2005. North American models were sold as the Acura NSX.

Cars with the 3.0 L C30A engine are referred to as NA1 models, while the 3.2 L C32B engine cars are known as NA2 models.

North American sales figures

Second generation (NC1; 2016)

In December 2007, Acura announced plans to launch a NSX successor by 2010, based on the styling of the front V10-engined Acura ASCC (Advanced Sports Car Concept). Despite prototypes being tested for production, just a year later, Honda announced that plans had been canceled due to poor economic conditions. Instead, in March 2010, Honda unveiled the HSV-010 GT for participation in the Japanese Super GT Championship. This car never reached production as a street-legal car.

Reports that Honda was again developing a successor to the NSX re-emerged in April 2011. By December 2011, Honda officially announced a second generation NSX concept, which was unveiled the following month at the 2012 North American International Auto Show as the Acura NSX Concept.

The production model was displayed three years later at the 2015 North American International Auto Show, for sale in 2016. 
Although the original name was retained, this time it was defined as "New Sports eXperience". Unlike the first generation NSX which was manufactured in Japan, the second generation NSX was designed and engineered in Marysville, Ohio, at Honda's plant, led by chief engineer Ted Klaus.

The transmission is a 9-speed dual-clutch automatic. Its body utilizes a space frame design—which is made from aluminum, ultra-high-strength steel, and other rigid and lightweight materials, some of which are the world's first applications.

The first production vehicle with VIN #001 was auctioned off by Barrett Jackson on 29 January 2016. The entire bid was donated to the charities Pediatric Brain Tumor Foundation and Camp Southern Ground. The first NSX rolled off the line in Ohio on 27 May 2016. Hendrick was there to drive it off. The first sales of the second generation NSX in the US were registered in June 2016.

The NSX Type S was revealed on August 12, 2021, with an increase to 602 hp. The Type S is the last update before the November 2022 discontinuation. Only 300 units of the NSX Type S were destined for the United States, 30 units for Japan, and 15 units for Canada.

U.S. and European sales figures

References

NSX
Sports cars
Rear mid-engine, rear-wheel-drive vehicles
Cars introduced in 1990
24 Hours of Le Mans race cars
All-wheel-drive vehicles
Hybrid electric cars
2000s cars
2010s cars
2020s cars
Cars discontinued in 2022